This is a list of films which have placed number one at the box office in New Zealand during 2021.

Highest-grossing films

Records

Notes

References

See also
List of New Zealand films – New Zealand films by year
2021 in film

2021
New Zealand